Hypnodontopsis apiculata is a species of moss in the Rhachitheciaceae family. It is endemic to Japan.  Its natural habitat is urban areas. It is threatened by habitat loss.

References

Dicranales
Flora of Japan
Vulnerable plants
Taxonomy articles created by Polbot